The consort is the spouse of a reigning Grand Duke of Luxembourg. The consort of the current monarch is Maria Teresa, Grand Duchess of Luxembourg. Princess Stéphanie is expected to become the next royal consort upon the accession of Guillaume to the throne.

Countess consort of Luxembourg

House of Luxembourg-Ardennes (963–1136)

House of Luxembourg-Namur (1136–1196)

House of Hohenstaufen (1196–1197)

House of Luxembourg-Namur (1197–1247) 
None

House of Luxembourg-Limburg (1247–1354)

Duchess consort of Luxembourg

House of Luxembourg (1354–1443)

House of Valois-Burgundy (1443–1482)

House of Habsburg (1482–1700)

House of Bourbon (1700–1712)

House of Wittelsbach (1712–1713)

House of Habsburg (1713–1794)

Consort of Luxembourgish Grand Duchy

House of Orange-Nassau (1815–1890)

House of Nassau-Weilburg (since 1890)

See also
 List of Nassau consorts
 List of Dutch royal consorts
 Duchess of Limburg

Notes

Lists of Luxembourgian people
 
 
 
Luxembourg history-related lists
Luxembourg
Luxembourg
Monarchs of Luxembourg
Luxembourg, List of royal consorts of